KQEO is a commercial radio station located in Idaho Falls, Idaho, broadcasting on 107.1 FM. KQEO airs a classic hits music format branded as "Arrow 107.1". Disc Jockeys are Big Stu, Randy Rose, Marvelous Marv, Paul Walker, and Tom Kent. In late 2013, the station began evolving from a classic rock station to a classic hits presentation under PD Paul Walker.

In 2014, Big Stu became the Program Director (a.k.a. Rick Stewart a.k.a. Rick Sutherlin). Rick is also the Brand Manager for 99 KUPI & 100.7 My-FM.

External links

QEO
Classic hits radio stations in the United States
Radio stations established in 2003